Morrill is an unincorporated area that formerly held a distinct community in Cherokee County, Texas, United States. The site is along Farm to Market Road 1911 near Rusk.

References

Ghost towns in East Texas